The Ivan Allen Jr. Braves Museum and Hall of Fame (BMHF) was founded in 1999, to honor various players, managers, coaches, executives, and others who have been a part of the Atlanta Braves professional-baseball franchise during its years in Boston (1871–1952), Milwaukee (1953–1965), and/or Atlanta (1966–present). The Museum and Hall of Fame, named after former Atlanta mayor Ivan Allen Jr., was located in Turner Field on the northwest side at Aisle 134.

Exhibits

Braves Hall of Fame

The Braves Hall of Fame consists of 35 members who contributed to the franchise during its 152 seasons, whether they were players, managers, broadcasters, or owners.

Members

"City" Exhibits

The museum featured three "city" exhibits (for Boston, Milwaukee, and Atlanta) that each featured items and information for the Braves from their times in that respective city. Included in these exhibits were "Babe Ruth as a Brave" and the 1914 World Series exhibit from Boston, a section of an original Baltimore and Ohio Railroad Car and the 1957 World Series exhibit from Milwaukee, and Hank Aaron's 715th home run exhibit and the 1995 World Series exhibit with replica rings and the Commissioner's Trophy from Atlanta.

"Braves in Cooperstown"
This exhibit featured photos of all who played for the Braves franchise who are members of the National Baseball Hall of Fame.

Braves in National Baseball Hall of Fame

"The Transformation of Turner Field"
This exhibit showed how Centennial Olympic Stadium was transformed into Turner Field following the 1996 Summer Olympics.

"Braves Leaderboard"
This exhibit featured a large scoreboard that tracked current players' progress into breaking Braves franchise pitching and hitting records.

Move to Truist Park
The Braves decided against building a museum into Truist Park, instead preferring to have the memorabilia throughout the new park.

See also

Ty Cobb Museum
Georgia Sports Hall of Fame
List of museums in Georgia (U.S. state)
Milwaukee Braves Wall of Honor

References

External links
Braves Museum and Hall of Fame official webpage

Atlanta Braves
Atl
Halls of fame in Georgia (U.S. state)
Sports museums in Georgia (U.S. state)
Baseball in Atlanta
Museums in Atlanta
Defunct museums in Georgia (U.S. state)
Museums established in 1999
Museums disestablished in 2016
1999 establishments in Georgia (U.S. state)
2016 disestablishments in Georgia (U.S. state)